Lämmel is a surname. Notable people with the surname include:

 Andreas Lämmel (born 1959), German politician
 Inge Lammel, Inge Rackwitz (1924–2015), German musicologist
 Lukas Lämmel (born 1997), German footballer

See also
 Sammel